In mathematics, a Szegő polynomial is one of a family of orthogonal polynomials for the Hermitian inner product

where dμ is a given positive measure on [−π, π]. Writing  for the polynomials, they obey a recurrence relation

where  is a parameter, called the reflection coefficient or the Szegő parameter.

See also 
 Cayley transform
 Schur class
 Favard's theorem

References

G. Szegő, "Orthogonal polynomials", Colloq. Publ., 33, Amer. Math. Soc.  (1967)

Orthogonal polynomials